Villanueva de la Sierra is a municipality located in the province of Cáceres, Extremadura, Spain. According to the 2005 census (INE), the municipality has a population of 577 inhabitants.

Arbor Day 

Villanueva Sierra is the town that held the first Arbor Day in the world. The initiative was launched in 1805 by the local priest.

Arbor Day is celebrated every Carnival Tuesday and is an important day in the local festival calendar.

References 

Municipalities in the Province of Cáceres